Charlie Daniels is the self-titled debut album of American musician Charlie Daniels. It was released in 1970 courtesy of Capitol Records.

Track listing

Side one

Side two

Personnel
Charlie Daniels - guitar, fiddle, vocals
Bob Wilson - keyboards
Jerry Corbitt - guitar, harmony vocals
Ben Keith - steel guitar, slide guitar
Billy Cox - bass
Tim Drummond - bass
Earl Grigsby - bass, vocals
Karl Himmel - drums
Jeffrey Myer - drums
Technical
Ernie Winfrey, Rex Collier - engineer
Rich Schmitt - remixing

Critical reception

Charlie Daniels received five stars out of five from Stephen Thomas Erlewine of Allmusic. Erlewine concludes that "he's [Charlie Daniels] a redneck rebel, not fitting into either the country or the rock & roll of 1970 with his record, but, in retrospect, he sounds like a visionary, pointing the way to the future when southern rockers saw no dividing lines between rock, country, and blues, and only saw it all as sons of the south. That's what he achieves with Charlie Daniels -- a unique Southern sound that's quintessentially American, sounding at once new and timeless. Once he formed the Charlie Daniels Band, he became a star and with Fire on the Mountain, he had another classic, but he would never sound as wild, unpredictable, or as much like a maverick as he does on this superb album.".

References 

1970 debut albums
Charlie Daniels albums
Capitol Records albums